Gwenaelle Tasha Mae Agnese-Semerád better known as Gwen Zamora (born August 10, 1990) is a Filipina-French actress, model and former dancer in the Philippines. She was previously under GMA Network for six years until switching management to Viva Artists Agency and now does freelance projects with both ABS-CBN and GMA Network.

Biography
Zamora was born in Australia to Italian-French dad and Filipino-Vietnamese mom. She spent her life in Australia, China and Thailand before moved to the Philippines when she was 14,  Zamora has enrolled in Digital Filmmaking at the De La Salle–College of Saint Benilde. At 19, she has traveled the world and has lived in different countries because of her father.

Zamora joined GMA Network, playing Cinderella in the evening teleserye, Grazilda. She also starred in the film Si Agimat at si Enteng Kabisote a film produced by GMA Films.
She appeared in Alakdana and in the television series Machete in January 2011, which was followed by Biritera and My Beloved.

Zamora joined in a GMA Christmas reality show, Puso ng Pasko: Artista Challenge in December 2010 and stars in the GMA horror comedy anthology, Spooky Nights Presents: Snow White Lady and the Seven Ghost and Spooky Nights Presents: Panata which premiered in 2011.

On August 15, 2019, Zamora gave birth to their first child with basketball player David Semerád. They were married in France on February 13, 2021.

2010–present

GMA Network (2010–2016)
She signed a three-year exclusive contract with GMA Network and starred in its several programs.

Zamora played Faye Kabisote, an Engkantada Princess, in the 2010 Official Entry to the Metro Manila Film Festival, Si Agimat at si Enteng Kabisote. The movie is top-billed by Vic Sotto and Sen. Bong Revilla.

ABS-CBN and GMA-7 (2016–present) 
She appeared on ABS-CBN's Be My Lady as Sophia Elizalde, her first show out of GMA Network while also a freelancer and then performed in ASAP. She made her return to Kapuso channel though was not visible on any of the teleseryes produced by the network and just appeared in non-drama soap programs though had a role in Dear Uge. Zamora staged a Kapamilya comeback and appeared on comedy-gag show Banana Sundae and a special participation role as the young version of Divina played by veteran actress, Pilar Pilapil, in Nang Ngumiti ang Langit, which also marks her return to television dramas.

Talent
Zamora has already appeared in numerous programs from Grazilda to Alakdana; and she already had her first co-starring role in a movie opposite Vic Sotto.

FHM
In 2011, she was voted as FHM Philippines' Sexiest Woman in the World Rank 42.

Filmography

Television

Film

Music video appearances

Awards and nominations

References

External links
 Gwen Zamora at the www.gmanetwork.com
 
 Gwen Zamora Official Website at the gwensterofficial.webs.com
 Gwen Zamora PEP.com.ph at PEP.com.ph

1990 births
Living people
Filipino television actresses
Filipino film actresses
Filipino child actresses
Filipino female models
Filipina gravure idols
De La Salle–College of Saint Benilde alumni
Filipino people of Italian descent
Filipino people of French descent
Filipino people of Vietnamese descent
GMA Network personalities
ABS-CBN personalities
Viva Artists Agency